Goi Rui Xuan (born 26 February 2001) is a Singaporean table tennis player. Her highest career ITTF ranking was 188.

Education 
Goi studied at Singapore Sports School for four years, and had deferred her diploma studies which was offered as part of a through-train programme, to train full time.

Career 
In 2017, Goi participated in table tennis mixed doubles event at the 2017 Asean School Games with Gerald Yu, and won gold.

In 2018, Goi qualified for the table tennis singles event at the 2018 Summer Youth Olympics, and represented Singapore. In 2019, Goi participated in table tennis women's doubles event at the 2019 Southeast Asian Games along with Wong Xin Ru, and won bronze medal.

References

2001 births
Living people
Singaporean sportspeople of Chinese descent
Singaporean female table tennis players
Table tennis players at the 2018 Summer Youth Olympics
Competitors at the 2021 Southeast Asian Games
Southeast Asian Games silver medalists for Singapore
Southeast Asian Games bronze medalists for Singapore
Southeast Asian Games medalists in table tennis